This page lists tree and large shrub species native to New York City, as well as cultivated, invasive, naturalized, and introduced species.

List of trees growing in New York City
This list includes street trees of New York City; as well as trees planted in New York City parks and public spaces:

See also 
 Trees of New York City

References

External links
New York City Tree Map

Lists of trees
Trees of New York City
New York City-related lists